Harpalus ellipsis is a species of ground beetle in the subfamily Harpalinae. It was described by John Lawrence LeConte in 1848.

References

ellipsis
Beetles described in 1848